First-seeded James Anderson defeated Gerald Patterson 11–9, 2–6, 6–2, 6–3 in the final to win the men's singles tennis title at the 1925 Australasian Championships.

Seeds
The seeded players are listed below. James Anderson is the champion; others show the round in which they were eliminated.

 James Anderson (champion)
 Gerald Patterson (finalist)
 Pat O'Hara Wood (semifinals)
 Norman Peach (quarterfinals)
 Fred Kalms (quarterfinals)
 Bob Schlesinger (semifinals)
 Gar Hone (quarterfinals)
 Jack Cummings (second round)

Draw

Key
 Q = Qualifier
 WC = Wild card
 LL = Lucky loser
 r = Retired

Finals

Earlier rounds

Section 1

Section 2

Section 3

Section 4

External links
 
  Source for the draw
   Sources for seedings

1925 in Australian tennis
Men's Singles